Bavaki or Bauki or Bavki may refer to:
 Bavaki-ye Amir Bakhtiar, a village in Lorestan Province, Iran
 Bovaki, a village in Lorestan Province, Iran
 BAVAKI, a house/ techno dj from the Netherlands